The East Australia hotspot is a volcanic province in southeast Australia which includes the Peak Range in central Queensland, the Main Range on the Queensland-New South Wales border, Tweed Volcano in New South Wales, and the Newer Volcanics Province (NVP) in Victoria and South Australia. A number of the volcanoes in the province have erupted since Aboriginal settlement (46,000 BP). The most recent eruptions were about 5,600 years ago, and memories of them survive in Aboriginal folklore. These eruptions formed the volcanoes Mount Schank and Mount Gambier in the NVP. There have been no eruptions on the Australian mainland since European settlement.

Unlike most hotspots, the East Australia hotspot has explosive eruptions similar to the runny lava flows of the Hawaii hotspot, the Iceland hotspot and the Réunion hotspot. The hotspot is thought to be explosive because basaltic magma interacts with groundwater in aquifers below the surface producing violent phreatomagmatic eruptions.

The cause of volcanism in the area is uncertain. Theories typically fall into one of two categories: the mantle plume theory and the plate theory. On the basis of the long duration of volcanic activity, its vast lateral extent, geochemistry of lavas, and seismic data, it has been proposed that the region is underlain by one or more deep mantle plumes which have forced magma up through points of weakness in the Indo-Australian Plate as it has moved northward over the source.

The lack of clear age progression across the province and the orientation of the NVP, which is orthogonal to plate motion, are inconsistent with plume models. Furthermore, seismic anomalies terminate at a depth of around 200 km, making the presence of a mantle plume unlikely.

Various tectonic causes have been proposed. Some studies have argued that volcanic activity results from a combination of edge-driven convection (small-scale, shallow mantle convection caused by a change in lithospheric thickness at the continental margin where thick continental lithosphere meets thinner oceanic lithosphere) and decompression of the crust from normal faulting caused by plate stresses. Another view is that extension from stresses brought about by changes in plate boundary configurations has caused severe lithospheric thinning resulting in decompression melting of the asthenosphere. Both of these models invoke shallow processes closely related to the operation of plate tectonics and so fall under the plate theory. Other models combine both plume and plate-tectonic processes.

See also
List of volcanoes in Australia
Hawai'i hotspot

References

External links
Volcanoes & Earthquakes in SE Australia from the University of Western Australia

Hotspots (geology)